Allrams höjdarpaket ("Allram's Top-Notch Parcel") was the name of Sveriges Television's Christmas calendar in 2004.

Plot 
The doll Allram Eest airs Christmas TV together with his sidekick Tjet from a Norrland cottage in the Scandinavian Mountains.

Video 
The series was released to DVD on 25 November 2005.

Videogame 
With Allrams höjdarpacket came a game called Allrams höjdarspel its a game with a bunch of minigames. You can play a new game every day until Christmas Eve.

References

External links 
 

2004 Swedish television series debuts
2004 Swedish television series endings
Sveriges Television's Christmas calendar
Swedish television shows featuring puppetry